Christopher R. Kissock (born May 2, 1985 in Trail, British Columbia) is a Canadian former professional baseball pitcher who was in the minor league baseball organization of the Philadelphia Phillies of Major League Baseball, but is currently retired from the Winnipeg Goldeyes after being released by the Phillies on August 3, 2012. Kissock has also competed for the Canadian national baseball team.

Kissock attended J. Lloyd Crowe Secondary School and Lewis–Clark State College. He was drafted by the Philadelphia Phillies in the 9th round (293rd overall) of the 2007 Major League Baseball Draft.

Kissock has played for the Canadian national baseball team. In 2011, he participated in the 2011 Baseball World Cup, winning the bronze medal, and the Pan American Games, winning the gold medal.

References

External links

1982 births
Living people
Baseball people from British Columbia
Baseball pitchers
Baseball players at the 2011 Pan American Games
Canada national baseball team players
Canadian expatriate baseball players in the United States
Clearwater Threshers players
Honolulu Sharks players
Lakewood BlueClaws players
Lewis–Clark State Warriors baseball players
Mesa Solar Sox players
Pan American Games gold medalists for Canada
Pan American Games medalists in baseball
People from Trail, British Columbia
Reading Phillies players
Williamsport Crosscutters players
Winnipeg Goldeyes players
Medalists at the 2011 Pan American Games